HD 22764, also known as HR 1112, is an orange hued star located in the northern circumpolar constellation Camelopardalis. It has an apparent magnitude of 5.78, allowing it to be faintly visible to the naked eye. At its current distance, HD 22764's brightness is diminished by 0.66 magnitudes due to interstellar dust.<ref name="Mel'nik2017/>

The object has two stellar classifications; one states that it is an ageing red giant (K3.5 IIIb) while the other instead lists it as a slightly cooler lower luminosity red supergiant (K4 Ib). Age estimates range from 47 up to 820 million years. It has an iron abundance 65% that of the Sun, making it metal deficient.

HD 22764 is the primary of a binary star consisting of it and HD 22763, a B8 giant star located 54.8" away along a position angle of 38°. There are also 4 line-of-sight companions located near the system.

References

K-type giants
K-type supergiants
Camelopardalis (constellation)
Binary stars
+59 00699
17342
1112
22764